Uganda competed in the Summer Olympic Games for the first time at the 1956 Summer Olympics in Melbourne, Australia. They had three competitors, all in the men's track and field athletics.

Competitors
Benjamin Nguda competed in the 100 metres, where he won his first round heat but was knocked out in the second round; and in the 200 metres, where he failed to progress beyond the first round.
Patrick Etolu competed in the high jump, where he came equal 12th with a height of 1.96m.
Lawrence Ogwang competed in the long jump, where he failed to qualify for the final; and in the triple jump, where he came 20th with a distance of 14.72m.

Athletics

Men
Track & road events

Field events

References
Official Olympic Report (PDF)

External links
sports-reference

Nations at the 1956 Summer Olympics
1956
1956 in Ugandan sport
1956 Summer Olympics